The 1941 Marshall Thundering Herd football team was an American football team that represented Marshall University as an independent during the 1941 college football season. In its seventh season under head coach Cam Henderson, the team compiled a 7–1 record and outscored opponents by a total of 217 to 47. Jim Pearcy and Ed Ulinski were the team captains.

Schedule

References

Marshall
Marshall Thundering Herd football seasons
Marshall Thundering Herd football